The 2004 Betta Electrical Sandown 500 the ninth round of the Australian 2004 V8 Supercar Championship Series. It was held on the weekend of 10–12 September 2004 at Sandown International Raceway in Melbourne, Victoria.

It was the 37th "Sandown 500" endurance race to be held at the Victorian circuit.

Top 10 Shootout 
The ten fastest cars from Qualifying contested a Top 10 Shootout on the Saturday to determine the starting positions on the first five rows of the grid.

Sourced from:

Official results
Sourced from:

 - Neil McFadyen practiced the #23 WPS Falcon, but was withdrawn due to a stomach virus, he was replaced by Charlie O'Brien.

Statistics
 Provisional Pole Position - #29 Paul Morris - 1:22.8431
 Pole Position - #51 Rick Kelly - 1:22.1422
 Fastest Lap - #1 Marcos Ambrose - 1:10.8251 (new lap record)
 Race Average Speed - 135km/h

References

External links
 Official race results
 Official V8 Supercar website
 Race images at au.motorsport.com

Motorsport at Sandown
Betta Electrical 500
Pre-Bathurst 500